Pterostylis auriculata is a species of orchid endemic to New Zealand. Unlike many other greenhood orchids, this species lacks a rosette of leaves but instead only has leaves on the flowering stem. All parts of the plant are glossy and there is a single green flower with a reddish tinge.

Description
Pterostylis auriculata is a terrestrial, perennial, deciduous, herb with an underground tuber and has four glossy green leaves on the flowering stem. There is a single glossy green flower with reddish tips. The dorsal sepal and petals are fused, forming a hood or "galea" over the column. Flowering occurs from October to November.

Taxonomy and naming
Pterostylis auriculata was first formally described in 1889 by William Colenso and the description was published in Transactions and Proceedings of the New Zealand Institute. The specific epithet means "small eared".

Distribution and habitat
This greenhood grows in damp, heavily shaded forest on southern parts of South Island of New Zealand and on Chatham, Stewart and Kapiti Islands.

References

auriculata
Orchids of New Zealand
Plants described in 1889